Wunnenstein is a hill in Baden-Württemberg, Germany.

Mountains and hills of Baden-Württemberg